The 2018–19 UNC Asheville Bulldogs men's basketball team represented the University of North Carolina at Asheville during the 2018–19 NCAA Division I men's basketball season. The Bulldogs, led by first-year head coach Mike Morrell, played their home games at Kimmel Arena as members of the Big South Conference.

Previous season 
The Bulldogs finished the season 21–13, 13–5 in Big South play to win the Big South regular season championship. They defeated Charleston Southern in the quarterfinals of the Big South tournament before being upset in the semifinals by Liberty. As a regular season conference champion who failed to win their conference tournament, they received an automatic bid to the National Invitation Tournament where they lost in the first round to USC.

On March 24, 2018, head coach Nick McDevitt accepted the head coaching job at Middle Tennessee. He finished at UNC Asheville with a five-year record of 98–65.

Roster

Schedule and results

|-
!colspan=9 style=| Non-conference regular season

|-
!colspan=9 style=| Big South Conference regular season

|-
!colspan=9 style=| Big South tournament

References

UNC Asheville Bulldogs men's basketball seasons
UNC Asheville
Asheville
Asheville